Vinoba Bhave University is a state university located in Hazaribagh, Jharkhand, India, about 100 km from Ranchi, the state capital. The university offers courses at the undergraduate and post-graduate levels. It manages and maintains 12 constituent colleges, as well as 61 affiliated colleges which teach up to the undergraduate level. The university educates people in physical science, life science, earth science, social science, humanities, commerce, technology, medical science, law, education, homeopathy and ayurvedic medicines.  The university came into existence on 17 September 1992 as a result of the bifurcation of Ranchi University.  

The Governor of Jharkhand is the chancellor of Vinoba Bhave University. The university is a member of the Association of Commonwealth Universities. The University Grants Commission recognized the university and registered it under section 12B of the University Grants Commission Act, 1956.

Affiliated colleges
Its jurisdiction extends over 5 districts: Chatra, Giridih, Hazaribagh, Koderma, and Ramgarh.

See also
 List of universities in India
 List of institutions of higher education in Jharkhand

References

External links

 

 
Hazaribagh
Educational institutions established in 1992
1992 establishments in Bihar

State universities in Jharkhand